Sven Matthes (born 23 August 1969) is a German sprinter who held the World Junior Record in 60 metres for 13 years between 1988 and 2001 with a time of 6.53 seconds.

Biography
Matthes, who was born in East Germany, also received a bronze medal in 100 metres in the European Junior Championships in Birmingham, England in 1987 with a time of 10.47 seconds. He improved his time to 10.11 seconds in Rostock on 22 June 1989 and holds a spot in European Under-23 All Time List with this performance.

See also
 German all-time top lists - 100 metres

References

1969 births
East German male sprinters
Athletes (track and field) at the 1988 Summer Olympics
Olympic athletes of East Germany
Living people